Manuel González García may refer to:

 Manuel Asur (Manuel Asur González García, born 1947), Spanish essayist and poet
 Manuel González García (bishop) (1877–1940), Spanish bishop